Park Si-hun (born December 16, 1965) is a retired South Korean amateur boxer. He won a gold medal in the men's light middleweight category at the 1988 Summer Olympics, being awarded victory over Roy Jones Jr. of the United States even though most observers considered that Jones had clearly won. The result was widely condemned and led to reforms in the way boxing is scored at the Olympics.

Career 
Park's first major success came in 1985 when he won the light middleweight gold at the Boxing World Cup, defeating 1985 European Champion Michael Timm and 1984 US national champion Kevin Bryant.

Park competed for South Korea at the 1988 Summer Olympics in Seoul. In Park's quarterfinal bout against Vincenzo Nardiello of Italy, Nardiello easily won the first two rounds, but because Park won the third round by a large margin, he was given the fight. Nardiello then had to be dragged out of the ring, shouting at the judges.

In the finals for the men's light middleweight, Park fought American boxer Roy Jones Jr. Park was named the winner of the bout following a 3–2 decision by the judges. Later scoring indicated that Jones had landed 86 punches to Park's 32. Jones has said that Park apologized to him afterward. Several journalists made sworn statements that judge Hiouad Larbi of Morocco said after the match that he acknowledged that Jones had won easily, but chose to rule in favor of Park in order to placate the South Korean spectators. Two of the three judges voting for Park were eventually banned from the sport for life.

The Jones-Park incident, along with another highly disputed decision against American Michael Carbajal in the same games, led Olympic organizers to establish a new scoring system for Olympic boxing.

Coaching career
After the 1988 Olympics, Park retired from boxing without turning professional. He earned a bachelor's degree in physical education at Kyungnam University and served as a high school physical education teacher in Jinhae, Gyeongsangnam-do until 2001, when he was named an assistant coach of the South Korea national amateur boxing team. He was also named an assistant coach at Pohang Poseidons. Later, he became a head coach of the South Korea Olympic team.

In 2008, Park participated in the inaugural World Youth Amateur Boxing Championships as the coach of Team Korea. He is the coach of the reserve team of the South Korea national boxing team.

Results

References

1965 births
Boxers at the 1988 Summer Olympics
Living people
Middleweight boxers
Olympic boxers of South Korea
Olympic gold medalists for South Korea
Olympic medalists in boxing
South Korean male boxers
Medalists at the 1988 Summer Olympics
South Korean Buddhists
People from Haman County
Sportspeople from South Gyeongsang Province